The following is a partial list of the "F" codes for Medical Subject Headings (MeSH), as defined by the United States National Library of Medicine (NLM).

This list continues the information at List of MeSH codes (F02). Codes following these are found at List of MeSH codes (F04). For other MeSH codes, see List of MeSH codes.

The source for this content is the set of 2006 MeSH Trees from the NLM.

– mental disorders

– adjustment disorders

– anxiety disorders
  – agoraphobia
  – neurocirculatory asthenia
  – obsessive-compulsive disorder
  – panic disorder
  – phobic disorders
  – stress disorders, traumatic
  – combat disorders
  – stress disorders, traumatic, acute
  – stress disorders, post-traumatic

– delirium, dementia, amnestic, cognitive disorders
  – amnesia
  – alcohol amnestic disorder
  – korsakoff syndrome
  – amnesia, anterograde
  – amnesia, retrograde
  – amnesia, transient global
  – cognitive disorder
  – auditory processing disorder
  – huntington disease
  – Disorders of consciousness
  – delirium
  – dementia
  – aids dementia complex
  – alzheimer disease
  – primary progressive aphasia
  – creutzfeldt-jakob syndrome
  – dementia, vascular
  – dementia, multi-infarct
  – huntington disease
  – Klüver-Bucy syndrome
  – lewy body disease
  – pick disease of the brain
  – Alexia (condition)
  – alexia, pure

– dissociative disorders
  – multiple personality disorder

– eating disorders
  – anorexia nervosa
  – bulimia nervosa
  – coprophagia
  – pica

– factitious disorders
  – munchausen syndrome

– impulse control disorders
  – firesetting behavior
  – gambling
  – trichotillomania

– mental disorders diagnosed in childhood
  – anxiety, separation
  – attention deficit and disruptive behavior disorders
  – attention deficit disorder with hyperactivity
  – conduct disorder
  – child behavior disorders
  – child development disorders, pervasive
  – asperger syndrome
  – autistic disorder
  – rett syndrome
  – schizophrenia, childhood
  – communication disorders
  – learning disorders
  – dyslexia
  – dyslexia, acquired
  – developmental disabilities
  – elimination disorders
  – encopresis
  – enuresis
  – feeding and eating disorders of childhood
  – pica
  – learning disorders
  – dyslexia
  – dyslexia, acquired
  – mental retardation
  – motor skills disorders
  – mutism
  – reactive attachment disorder
  – stereotypic movement disorder
  – tic disorders
  – tourette syndrome

– mood disorders
  – affective disorders, psychotic
  – bipolar disorder
  – cyclothymic disorder
  – depressive disorder
  – depression, postpartum
  – depressive disorder, major
  – dysthymic disorder
  – seasonal affective disorder

– neurotic disorders

– personality disorders
  – antisocial personality disorder
  – borderline personality disorder
  – compulsive personality disorder
  – dependent personality disorder
  – histrionic personality disorder
  – hysteria
  – paranoid personality disorder
  – passive-aggressive personality disorder
  – schizoid personality disorder
  – schizotypal personality disorder

– schizophrenia and disorders with psychotic features
  – capgras syndrome
  – paranoid disorders
  – psychotic disorders
  – psychoses, substance-induced
  – psychoses, alcoholic
  – schizophrenia
  – schizophrenia, catatonic
  – schizophrenia, disorganized
  – schizophrenia, paranoid
  – shared paranoid disorder

– sexual and gender disorders
  – sexual dysfunctions, psychological
  – dyspareunia
  – impotence
  – paraphilias
  – exhibitionism
  – fetishism (psychiatric)
  – masochism
  – pedophilia
  – sadism
  – transvestism
  – voyeurism
  – transsexualism
  – vaginismus

– sleep disorders
  – dyssomnias
  – sleep deprivation
  – sleep disorders, circadian rhythm
  – jet lag syndrome
  – sleep disorders, intrinsic
  – disorders of excessive somnolence
  – hypersomnolence, idiopathic
  – kleine-levin syndrome
  – narcolepsy
  – cataplexy
  – restless legs syndrome
  – sleep initiation and maintenance disorders
  – parasomnias
  – nocturnal paroxysmal dystonia
  – rem sleep parasomnias
  – rem sleep behavior disorder
  – sleep paralysis
  – restless legs syndrome
  – sleep arousal disorders
  – night terrors
  – somnambulism
  – sleep bruxism
  – sleep-wake transition disorders

– somatoform disorders
  – conversion disorder
  – hypochondriasis
  – neurasthenia

– substance-related disorders
  – alcohol-related disorders
  – alcohol amnestic disorder
  – korsakoff syndrome
  – alcohol withdrawal delirium
  – alcoholic intoxication
  – alcoholism
  – psychoses, alcoholic
  – wernicke encephalopathy
  – amphetamine-related disorders
  – cocaine-related disorders
  – marijuana abuse
  – neonatal abstinence syndrome
  – opioid-related disorders
  – heroin dependence
  – morphine dependence
  – phencyclidine abuse
  – psychoses, substance-induced
  – substance abuse, intravenous
  – substance withdrawal syndrome
  – alcohol withdrawal delirium
  – tobacco use disorder

The list continues at List of MeSH codes (F04).

F03